The Chicks (formerly known as the Dixie Chicks) are an American country music band composed of Natalie Maines, along with Emily Strayer and Martie Maguire, who are sisters. Their discography comprises eight studio albums, two live albums and 28 singles.

Founded in 1989 as a more bluegrass-oriented band with Maguire and Strayer—then going by their birth surnames of Erwin—along with Laura Lynch and Robin Lynn Macy, the band did not achieve mainstream success until Lynch and Macy left and were replaced by lead singer Natalie Maines. Shortly after her joining, the band signed to Monument Records, releasing their breakthrough album Wide Open Spaces in 1998. Both it and its followup, 1999's Fly, earned the group several Grammy Awards and chart singles. Two more albums, Home and Taking the Long Way, followed in 2002 and 2006, respectively, on Columbia Records. These latter four albums have been certified double platinum or higher by the RIAA, with the highest-certified being Wide Open Spaces at 13× Platinum for US shipments of 13 million copies.

Of the Dixie Chicks' 25 singles, six have reached Number One on the Billboard country singles chart: "There's Your Trouble", "Wide Open Spaces", "You Were Mine", "Cowboy Take Me Away", "Without You", and "Travelin' Soldier". A seventh, a version of the Fleetwood Mac song "Landslide", was also a Number One hit on the Adult Contemporary chart. Several of their singles have crossed over to the Billboard Hot 100, with their highest-peaking there being the number 4, "Not Ready to Make Nice".

Albums

Studio albums

Live albums

Compilation albums

Singles

Other charted songs

Videography

Video albums

Music videos

Guest appearances

Notes

References

The Chicks
Country music discographies
Discographies of American artists